Thomas Beacham may refer to:

 Thomas Beecham (1879–1961), English conductor and impresario
 Thomas Beacham (footballer) (1878–1947), Australian rules footballer